This page lists all described species of the spider family Gradungulidae accepted by the World Spider Catalog :

Gradungula

Gradungula Forster, 1955
 G. sorenseni Forster, 1955 (type) — New Zealand

Kaiya

Kaiya Gray, 1987
 K. bemboka Gray, 1987 — Australia (New South Wales)
 K. brindabella (Moran, 1985) — Australian Capital Territory
 K. parnabyi Gray, 1987 — Australia (Victoria)
 K. terama Gray, 1987 (type) — Australia (New South Wales)

Macrogradungula

Macrogradungula Gray, 1987
 M. moonya Gray, 1987 (type) — Australia (Queensland)

Pianoa

Pianoa Forster, 1987
 P. isolata Forster, 1987 (type) — New Zealand

Progradungula

Progradungula Forster & Gray, 1979
 P. carraiensis Forster & Gray, 1979 (type) — Australia (New South Wales)
 P. otwayensis Milledge, 1997 — Australia (Victoria)

Spelungula

Spelungula Forster, 1987
 S. cavernicola Forster, 1987 (type) — New Zealand

Tarlina

Tarlina Gray, 1987
 T. daviesae Gray, 1987 — Australia (Queensland)
 T. milledgei Gray, 1987 — Australia (New South Wales)
 T. noorundi Gray, 1987 (type) — Australia (New South Wales)
 T. simipes Gray, 1987 — Australia (Queensland)
 T. smithersi Gray, 1987 — Australia (New South Wales)
 T. woodwardi (Forster, 1955) — Australia (Queensland)

References

Gradungulidae